Metris may refer to:
Metriš, a village in the municipality of Zaječar, Serbia
Mercedes-Benz Metris, a minivan sold by Mercedes-Benz in North America
Metris Prison, a prison in Istanbul, Turkey
Metris, an American credit card issuer acquired by HSBC in 2005